BINAC (Binary Automatic Computer) was an early electronic computer designed for Northrop Aircraft Company by the Eckert–Mauchly Computer Corporation (EMCC) in 1949.  Eckert and Mauchly, though they had started the design of EDVAC at the University of Pennsylvania, chose to leave and start EMCC, the first computer company.  BINAC was their first product, the first stored-program computer in the United States; BINAC is also sometimes claimed to be the world's first commercial digital computer even though it was limited in scope and never fully functional after delivery.

Architecture
The BINAC was a bit-serial binary computer with two independent CPUs, each with its own 512-word acoustic mercury delay-line memory. The CPUs continuously compared results to check for errors caused by hardware failures. It used approximately 700 vacuum tubes. The 512-word acoustic mercury delay-line memories were divided into 16 channels, each holding 32 words of 31 bits, with an additional 11-bit space between words to allow for circuit delays in switching. The clock rate was 4.25 MHz (1 MHz according to one source), which yielded a word access time of about 10 microseconds. The addition time was 800 microseconds, and the multiplication time was 1200 microseconds. Programs or data were entered manually in octal using an eight-key keypad or were loaded from magnetic tape. BINAC was significant for being able to perform high-speed arithmetic on binary numbers, with no provisions to store characters or decimal digits.

Early test programs
The BINAC ran a test program (consisting of 23 instructions) in March 1949, although it was not fully functional at the time.  Here are early test programs that BINAC ran:

 February 7, 1949 – Ran a five-line program to fill the memory from register A.
 February 10, 1949 – Ran a five-line program to check memory.
 February 16, 1949 – Ran a six-line program to fill memory.
 March 7, 1949 – Ran 217 iterations of a 23-line program to compute squares.  It was still running correctly when it stopped.
 April 4, 1949 – Ran a fifty-line program to fill memory and check all instructions.  It ran for 2.5 hours before encountering an error.  Shortly after that it ran for 31.5 hours without error.

Customer acceptance
Northrop accepted delivery of BINAC in September 1949.  Northrop employees said that BINAC never worked properly after it was delivered, although it had worked at the Eckert-Mauchly workshop.  It was able to run some small programs but did not work well enough to be used as a production machine. Northrop attributed the failures to it not being properly packed for shipping when Northrop picked it up; EMCC said that the problems were due to errors in re-assembly of the machine after shipping. Northrop, citing security considerations, refused to allow EMCC technicians near the machine after shipping, instead hiring a newly graduated engineering student to re-assemble it.  EMCC said that the fact that it worked at all after this was testimony to the engineering quality of the machine.

First computer user manual
Previous computers were the darlings of university departments of engineering; the users knew the machines well. The BINAC was going to go to an end user, and so a user manual was needed. Automobile "users" were quite accustomed in those days to doing significant servicing of their vehicles, and "user manuals" existed to help them. The BINAC manual writers took inspiration from those manuals when writing the user manual for the BINAC.

See also
 Ferranti Mark 1
 LEO (computer)
 List of vacuum-tube computers
 Short Code
 UNIVAC I

References

Further reading

External links
 Oral history interview with Isaac Levin Auerbach  Oral history interview by Nancy B. Stern, 10 April 1978. Charles Babbage Institute, University of Minnesota, Minneapolis.  Auerbach recounts his experiences at Electronic Control Company (later the Eckert-Mauchly Computer Company) during 1947–1949.  He emphasizes the economic and practical infeasibility of the BINAC computer project for Northrop Aircraft. Auerbach also discusses the UNIVAC, including personalities, politics, and its technical features. The roles of the National Bureau of Standards, Northrop Aircraft, Raytheon, Remington Rand, and IBM.
 
 Roger Mills' Description of the BINAC
 Picture of BINAC history sign in Northeast Philadelphia
 YouTube: Video History of BINAC

Vacuum tube computers
One-of-a-kind computers
1940s computers
Computer-related introductions in 1949
Serial computers